Focal Point Data Risk, LLC (commonly known as Focal Point) is an IT risk management consulting firm based in Tampa, FL. Focal Point was formed in January 2017 as the result of a merger between Sunera, APTEC, LLC, and ANRC LLC.

The company provides a range of cybersecurity, risk management, cybersecurity workforce development, and enterprise technology implementation services.

In 2017, Focal Point named former Cisco executive Brian Marlier as Chief Executive Officer.

Focal Point publishes the annual Cyber Balance Sheet Report, covering Board-level cyber issues.

History
Focal Point was originally founded as Sunera in April 2005 by former KPMG partners and executives. Sunera focused its original service offerings on IT controls testing, vulnerability assessments, internal audit, and Sarbanes-Oxley compliance.

In 2014, Sunera was acquired by Cyber Risk Management, a company formed by Norwest Equity Partners, Halyard Capital, and partners of Sunera.

Cyber Risk Management acquired ANRC, a cyber security training provider, in 2014, and APTEC, LLC, an identity and access management solutions integrator in 2015.

On February 6, 2015, Florida Governor Rick Scott announced the expansion of the company’s Tampa headquarters. This expansion brought 41 new jobs between 2015 and 2018.

References 

Computer security companies
Accounting firms of the United States
Consulting firms established in 2005
Software companies established in 2005
Companies based in Tampa, Florida
Companies based in Florida